Brian Sullivan (born July 19, 1971, Los Angeles, California) is a television news anchor and business journalist.

Biography
Brian Sullivan is an anchor and correspondent for CNBC. He is the network's Senior National Correspondent and presents the station's evening programme Last Call, having previously hosted Worldwide Exchange. Before this Brian co-hosted Power Lunch and Street Signs. 

Prior to joining CNBC in 2011, Sullivan produced, reported, and anchored at Bloomberg Television (12 years) and Fox Business (3 years). 

Sullivan is recognized as one of the first financial journalists to highlight the risks of the housing bubble. He has been nominated for two prestigious Loeb Awards, one for his 2013 documentary America's Gun: Rise of the AR-15 and the other for the 2007 special "Subprime Shockwaves," which also won the NY CPA Society Excellence in Financial Journalism award.

He is a frequent guest on the MSNBC program Morning Joe and has also appeared on NBC Sports.  In 2014 he reported from the Winter Olympics in Sochi, Russia.

Prior to joining Bloomberg in 1997, Sullivan traded chemical commodities for Mitsubishi International. He is a 1993 graduate of Virginia Tech double majoring in Political Science and history, where he played on the rugby team and is a member of Zeta Psi fraternity. He has received a law degree from Brooklyn Law School as well as a Certificate in Journalism from the New York University School of Continuing Education.

Sullivan also races cars competing in the SCCA class Spec Racer Ford.  He previously raced in the class Formula Mazda. He won both the 2003 NESCCA Formula Mazda and 2008 NESCCA Spec Racer Ford championships.

Sullivan is a graduate of James Wood High School in Winchester, Virginia.

References

External links
 

1971 births
Living people
American television news anchors
Brooklyn Law School alumni
CNBC people
Fox News people
People from Los Angeles
Racing drivers from California
Racing drivers from Los Angeles
Virginia Tech alumni
Journalists from California